The 1979 Stockholm Open was a tennis tournament played on hard courts. The men's event was part of the 1979 Colgate-Palmolive Grand Prix, while the women's took part of the 1979 WTA Tour and took place at the Kungliga tennishallen in Stockholm, Sweden. The women's tournament was held from 2 November through 5 November 1979 while the men's tournament was held from 5 November through 11 November 1979.

Finals

Men's singles

 John McEnroe defeated  Gene Mayer, 6–7, 6–3, 6–3

Women's singles
 Billie Jean King defeated  Betty Stöve, 6–3, 6–7, 7–5

Men's doubles

 Peter Fleming /  John McEnroe defeated  Tom Okker /  Wojciech Fibak, 6–4, 6–4

Women's doubles
 Betty Stöve /  Wendy Turnbull defeated  Billie Jean King /  Ilana Kloss, 7–5, 7–6

References

External links
  
  
 Association of Tennis Professionals (ATP) tournament profile

Stockholm Open
Stockholm Open
Stockholm Open
Stock
November 1979 sports events in Europe
1970s in Stockholm

it:Stockholm Open 1980